was a  of the Imperial Japanese Navy (IJN), sunk on 5 January 1945 by an American air attack west of Manila, in the South China Sea.

Design and description
Designed for ease of production, the Matsu class was smaller, slower and more lightly armed than previous destroyers as the IJN intended them for second-line duties like escorting convoys, releasing the larger ships for missions with the fleet. Their crew numbered 210 officers and enlisted men. The ships had two Kampon geared steam turbines, each driving one propeller shaft, using steam provided by two Kampon water-tube boilers.

The main armament of the Matsu-class ships consisted of three  Type 89 dual-purpose guns in one twin-gun mount aft and one single mount forward of the superstructure. The single mount was partially protected against spray by a gun shield. The accuracy of the Type 89 guns was severely reduced against aircraft because no high-angle gunnery director was fitted. The ships carried a total of 25 Type 96  anti-aircraft guns in 4 triple and 13 single mounts. The Matsus were equipped with Type 13 early-warning and Type 22 surface-search radars. The ships were also armed with a single rotating quadruple mount amidships for  torpedoes. They could deliver their 36 depth charges via two stern rails and two throwers.

Operational history
On 27 September 1944 off Iturup in the Kurile Islands (45º44'N, 148º41'E), Momi was damaged by a torpedo from the submarine .

Momi sortied from Kure on 16 December 1944 as part of the escort for the aircraft carrier . The remainder of the escort consisted of the destroyers  and Hinoki. Because an American invasion fleet had been spotted approaching the Philippine Islands, Unryū was intended to deliver a squadron of 30 Ohka kamikaze planes to Manila.

The task force sailed west through the Shimonoseki Straits to avoid American submarines, then turned south. On 19 December, the ship encountered the submarine , which sank Unryū, then submerged deep to escape the charging Hinoki. Shigure remained in the area to pick up survivors and unsuccessfully track down and sink the American submarine, while Hinoki and Momi shaped course for Japanese-occupied China. From there, they escorted Ikutagawa Maru to Manila, arriving on 4 January 1945.

The two destroyers were then ordered to withdraw to Taiwan, but were caught by American destroyers, including , on the afternoon of 5 January. They escaped 127 mm (5 in) gunfire and a spread of torpedoes fired from maximum range, but were caught by carrier-based aircraft from Task Force 77. A 454 kg (1,000 lb) bomb from a Douglas SBD Dauntless crippled Hinoki at 5:17 PM; and at 7:10 PM, a torpedo from a Grumman TBF Avenger struck Momi.

Citations

Bibliography

 

 "Star-Crossed Sortie: The Last Voyage of Unryū and DesDiv 52" by Anthony Tully (retrieved January 16, 2007)
 
 

Matsu-class destroyers
Ships built by Yokosuka Naval Arsenal
1944 ships
World War II destroyers of Japan
Destroyers sunk by aircraft
Ships lost with all hands
Maritime incidents in January 1945
Ships sunk by US aircraft